Richard Best PC(Ire) KC (11 December 1869 – 23 February 1939) was an Irish barrister, politician and Lord Justice of Appeal.

Best was born in Richhill, County Armagh, son of farmers Robert and Anne Best. He was educated at the Educational Institution, Dundalk (now Dundalk Grammar School) and Trinity College, Dublin where he was Senior Moderator (BA) in mathematics in 1892, and was called to the bar by the King's Inns, Dublin in 1895. He took silk in 1912 and was elected a bencher in 1918. In 1921 he was elected to the House of Commons of Northern Ireland as Unionist member for Armagh and later the same year he was appointed Attorney General for Northern Ireland. He was appointed to the Privy Council of Ireland in the 1922 New Year Honours, entitling him to the style "The Right Honourable".

In 1925 he was appointed a Lord Justice of Appeal of the Supreme Court of Northern Ireland, a position he held until his death.

In 1904, he married Sarah Constance Bevington in St John's Church, Sevenoaks, Kent. They had a son, also called Richard.

Arms

Footnotes

References
Obituary, The Times, 24 February 1939

1869 births
1939 deaths
People from County Armagh
Alumni of Trinity College Dublin
Irish barristers
Ulster Unionist Party members of the House of Commons of Northern Ireland
Members of the House of Commons of Northern Ireland 1921–1925
Members of the Privy Council of Ireland
Members of the Privy Council of Northern Ireland
Attorneys General for Northern Ireland
Northern Ireland junior government ministers (Parliament of Northern Ireland)
Lords Justice of Appeal of Northern Ireland
People educated at Dundalk Grammar School
Members of the House of Commons of Northern Ireland for County Armagh constituencies
Alumni of King's Inns